Youssef Ali Nesaif Boukhamas (born 1 January 1969) is a Bahraini athlete. He competed in the men's javelin throw at the 1992 Summer Olympics.

References

1969 births
Living people
Athletes (track and field) at the 1992 Summer Olympics
Bahraini male javelin throwers
Olympic athletes of Bahrain
Place of birth missing (living people)